Jimmy Gardner (December 25, 1885 in Lisdoonvarna, County Clare, Ireland – May 1964) was an Irish boxer in America from 1901 to 1917. Jimmy was the brother of George Gardner, once Light Heavyweight Champion, and Billy Gardner, a boxer as well. He was known as a clever fighter, rather than a power-hitter and only lost four fights in his first eight years. Gardner recorded 61 wins, 36 by knockout, and 8 losses.

Gardner's brother-in-law, Joe Thomas was a middleweight of the teens.

External links
Gardner's Record at Cyber Boxing Zone

Irish emigrants to the United States (before 1923)
Sportspeople from County Clare
1885 births
1964 deaths
Irish male boxers